The Master Sardines Fishing Champs are a Philippine 3x3 basketball team which competes in the PBA 3x3, organized by the Philippines' top-flight professional league, Philippine Basketball Association (PBA).

History
The Master Sardines Fishing Champs are a team sponsored by Universal Canning Inc. which formally expressed its intention to compete in the PBA 3x3 as early as March 2021. Universal Canning has previously fielded at least two teams in the traditional five-a-side game – Bacolod-Master Sardines and the Zamboanga Family's Brand Sardines in the Maharlika Pilipinas Basketball League. 

However the team ultimately did not feature in the first conference of the inaugural 2021 season. The team joined the season's second conference.

Current roster

Head coaches

References

External links

PBA 3x3 teams
2021 establishments in the Philippines
Basketball teams established in 2021